Extreme Ops is a 2002 action thriller film directed by Christian Duguay, written by Michael Zaidan, Timothy Scott Bogart, and Mark Mullin, and starring Devon Sawa, Bridgette Wilson-Sampras, Rupert Graves, and Rufus Sewell. The film's plot centers around a commercial director and three extreme sports enthusiasts who go on their trip to the Alps for a seasonal practice and stunt filming. They are unaware that they are filming on the same location which is actually a hideout of Serbia's most wanted war criminal, Slobodan Pavlov. Pavlov and his henchmen soon find out that the enthusiasts had been watched by the group and rush swiftly to kill the witnesses. Now racing for their lives against the helicopters and expert assassins, the enthusiasts must put their quick extreme sports skills to the test in order to escape the mountain.

Plot

Commercial director Ian, Hollywood producer Will, three extreme sports enthusiasts Chloe, Kittie and Silo, cinematographer Mark, and Ian's boss, Jeffery, take their trip to the Alps for seasonal practice and stunt filming in preparation for filming a daring, yet dangerous big-league advertisement against an actual avalanche. They are flown to a resort under construction for comfort by their helicopter pilot Zoran. On the first night of their stay, as Will and Silo are bluffing, they spot a man with a woman entering a room. Will and Silo, on a dare, secretly videotape the beginning of their affair, but are chased away by a pair of dogs. Will and the team are unaware that the man they videotaped is Serbia's most wanted war criminal, Slobodan Pavlov, who was believed to be killed in a plane crash, and that the resort the enthusiasts are residing is actually his hideout; the woman with Pavlov is his love interest, Yana (whom Jeffery had encountered on the train en route to the mountain). Pavlov is also accompanied by his henchmen, Ivo, Ratko, Goran, Jakša and Pavlov's son, Slavko. Will states later in the film that he read about Pavlov in a newspaper article. On the second day of filming, the enthusiasts proceed to film the first controlled avalanche. At nightfall, as Will, Chloe, Kittie and Silo play truth or dare in a hot tub Will had heated up using coal, Slavko spies on them. Deducing they had videotaped his father and mistaking them to be members of the CIA, he reports this to Pavlov, and recommends killing them swiftly, which Pavlov agrees to do.

On the third day of filming, after Ian, Will, Chloe, Kittie, Silo, and Mark head to the mountain again, Jeffery is kidnapped by Slavko and Ivo and is brought before Pavlov. After finding Will's camera and seeing the footage containing the start of the affair, Slavko and Ivo hijack Zoran's helicopter when he returns to the resort, and force Zoran to tell where the group is filming. Once they land on the mountain, Slavko and Ivo confront and hold the group at gunpoint. However, when a perverted Slavko attempts to force Chloe and Kittie to engage in foreplay, a disgusted Ivo pulls a gun on him, which escalates into a Mexican standoff between the two. Mark, who had planted explosives high up the mountain, detonates them on Ian's cue, startling Slavko and Ivo, and causing them to accidentally shoot each other dead. After narrowly escaping an avalanche in the helicopter, the group realize that by accidentally videotaping Pavle, they have jeopardized their own lives and plan an escape.

They return to the resort, but they find Ratko, Goran and Jakša roving the compound. They manage to subdue Ratko and attempt to escape on a cable car, but Pavlov, having been alerted of the group's presence, takes control of the cable car and has it sent back to the dock. The group make a quick escape and ski further down slope as Pavlov and his henchmen open fire, during which Kittie is nearly shot when they shoot her snowboard apart. They are blocked off by a very steep cliff, and decide to tether down to a gap they intend to use as an escape route. As Will is trying to tether down, Pavlov and his henchmen, after recapturing and killing Zoran, arrive in his helicopter. After throwing Zoran's body out, they open fire upon Will, who parachutes to safety, before concentrating their fire on the rest of the group. Silo manages to throw his snowboard into the helicopter, hitting Jakša and causing him to fall to his death, but not before he shoots Silo in the abdomen. The remaining henchmen attempt to continue shooting at them, but the helicopter's low fuel lines and the time remaining until nightfall force them to return to the hideout to refuel and wait out the night. Kittie stays behind to tend Silo's wounds, armed with a rocket launcher with only one round while Ian, Chloe and Mark split up to escape.

At the hideout, Pavlov tells Yana he is determined to kill them in an effort to avenge Slavko and Ivo, but then slaps her, threatening to kill her when she negatively mentions his son. After Pavlov leaves the room, Yana double crosses him and pleads with Jeffery to take her to New York. Jeffery agrees and they decide to wait until Pavlov and his remaining henchmen leave to track down the team again. Will, who has landed on a tree and stayed hidden throughout the day, manages to free himself and escape. As morning rises, Pavlov and his henchmen resume their objective. Hearing the helicopter approaching them, Ian and Chloe escape through another gap while Mark stays behind to set a trap. At the same time, Kittie attempts to fire the rocket into the helicopter, but it misses and nearly hits a cable car carrying Jeffery and Yana. As the helicopter hovers below the edge of a cliff, Mark takes out a string of cable and when he ski-jumps off the cliff, jams the tail rotors with the cable in mid-air before safely landing his jump. This causes the helicopter to spiral out of control and crash on the ledge of a cliff, killing everyone on board. The sound of the explosion causes a massive avalanche, and Ian and Chloe ski for their lives while also successfully video taping it for the commercial by having Chloe ski in front of it. They narrowly manage to take cover behind a rock as the snow nearly engulfs them.

Back in the States, after viewing the commercial to Mr. Imahara and his assistant, Kana, the commercial is met with a positive response and agree to air it on television. Ian then receives a phone call from Kittie, and tells him to look out the window. When he does, he sees that Will, Chloe, Kittie and Silo are on top of a train performing stunts, something they also did at the beginning of the film when they were en route to the Alps. The film ends when the four enthusiasts let go of their skateboards and let them fly through the commercial's billboard, one of which goes through Chloe's mouth as Ian says "There we go again" while smiling.

Cast

Production
Budgeted at $40 million, the film was financed via the German film fund Apollo Media, Canadian tax shelter monies and foreign presales. Producers were Moshe Diamant's Signature Entertainment and Jan Fantl's Quality International. Mark Damon's MDP Worldwide handled some of the film's presales. The film was originally titled The Extremists by Duguay for its main plot concerning both "extreme" sports and terrorists, but the title was changed to avoid the obvious negative connotations in a terror-obsessed post-9/11 society.

Critical reception
The film received overwhelmingly negative reviews from critics. The film holds a 7% rating on Rotten Tomatoes based on 66 reviews. The site's consensus stating: "The various stunts in Extreme Ops can't compensate for the inane storyline and bad dialogue." On Metacritic, it has a score of 17 out of 100 based on reviews from 14 critics, indicating "overwhelming dislike".

References

External links

2002 films
2000s English-language films
English-language German films
English-language Luxembourgian films
British chase films
2002 action thriller films
Paramount Pictures films
Films directed by Christian Duguay (director)
Films scored by Normand Corbeil
Films set in the Alps
Skiing films
Impact of the September 11 attacks on cinema
German thriller films
Luxembourgian thriller films
Films about the Serbian Mafia
Avalanches in film
2000s German films